The 1948 Northwestern Wildcats football team represented Northwestern University in the 1948 Big Nine Conference football season. The Wildcats won their first Rose Bowl in school history.

Northwestern finished the season with an 8–2 record, losing only to perennial powerhouses Michigan, 28–0, and Notre Dame, 17–12. Northwestern blanked UCLA, 19–0, Purdue, 21–0, and Syracuse, 48–0. The Wildcats rallied from three turnovers and a 16-point deficit to defeat Minnesota, 19–16, and beat Ohio State, 21–7, Wisconsin team, 16–7, and Illinois, 20–7. Big Nine Conference rules prevented conference champion Michigan from making a successive trip to the Rose Bowl, so second-place Northwestern won the bid instead.

Schedule

Roster
10 Bob Nelson
11 Loran "PeeWee" Day (halfback and safety)
14 Gene Miller 
15 Ed Tunnicliff(halfback)
16 Tom Worthington (halfback)
19 Bob Meeder
20 Lloyd Hawkinson
21 Don Burson (quarterback)
22 Frank Aschenbrenner (halfback)
23 Pat Keefe (quarterback)
25 John Yungwirth
26 Jim Farrar (extra points)
29 Dick Flowers (quarterback) 
30 Art Murakowski (fullback)
32 Armandy Cureau
33 Ralph Rossi
34 Gasper Perricone (fullback)
36 George Hlebasko 
37 George Sundheim
42 Johnny Miller
54 Alex Sarkisian (center). (team captain)
55 Chuck Petter 
56 Ray Wietecha
57 Dick Price
60 Lawrence "Fatso" Day (linemen)
61 Francis De Pauw
62 Richard Anderson
63 Bob Nowicki(guard)
67 Ed Nemeth (left guard)
68 Jim Parseigan
69 LeRoy Pantera
70 Joe Sewell
73 Bill Ford
71 Bill Forman (tackle)
74 Steve Sawle (tackle)
75 Rudy Cernoch (tackle)
77 George Maddock (kick offs)
78 Paul Barkal
79 Dick Eggers
80 Charles Hagmann (end)
82 Burton Keddie (end)
83 Don Stonesifer (end), 
85 Joe Zuravleff (end)
87 Al Thomas
88 Littrell Clark
97 Paul Balog

Awards and honors
 Art Murakowski, Chicago Tribune Silver Football

1949 NFL Draft

References

Northwestern
Northwestern Wildcats football seasons
Rose Bowl champion seasons
Northwestern Wildcats football